Cristian 'Ruso' Andrés García (born 29 April 1988) is an Argentine professional footballer who plays as a forward for Manta.

Football career
Born in San Rafael, Mendoza, García began his senior career with Club Atlético Banfield, making his competitive debut on 3 June 2007 against Gimnasia y Esgrima de Jujuy, coming on as an 85th-minute substitute in a 1–0 away win. He made his first start for the club two weeks later, in a 0–3 defeat at Club Atlético Belgrano.

García scored his first goal for Banfield in a 2–1 home win against Newell's Old Boys on 7 November 2008. During the 2009 Apertura tournament he only made a few appearances, but made an important contribution by netting twice in a 3–0 home win against reigning champions Club Atlético Vélez Sársfield on 14 November, as El Taladro won the first national championship in its history in the final day of the season.

Honours
Banfield
Argentine Primera División: Apertura 2009

External links
 BDFA profile 
 
 
 

1988 births
Living people
Sportspeople from Mendoza Province
Argentine footballers
Association football forwards
Argentine expatriate footballers
Argentine Primera División players
Primera Nacional players
Torneo Federal A players
Segunda División players
Ecuadorian Serie B players
Liga I players
Club Atlético Banfield footballers
Quilmes Atlético Club footballers
Godoy Cruz Antonio Tomba footballers
Real Murcia players
CD Tenerife players
CS Concordia Chiajna players
Gimnasia y Esgrima de Jujuy footballers
Deportivo Madryn players
Juventud Antoniana footballers
Sportivo Italiano footballers
Manta F.C. footballers
Argentine expatriate sportspeople in Spain
Argentine expatriate sportspeople in Romania
Argentine expatriate sportspeople in Ecuador
Expatriate footballers in Spain
Expatriate footballers in Romania
Expatriate footballers in Ecuador